Outpoint is a term frequently used in boxing to describe a situation in which one boxer is awarded more points than his or her opponent by the judges, but does not knock out that opponent.

Notes

Boxing terminology
Kickboxing terminology